Narora is a town located on the banks of river Gangas, in tehsil Dibai, district Bulandshahr, Uttar Pradesh, India. It is popular for being the site of Nuclear Power Corporation.

Demographics
 India census, Narora had a population of 20,376. Males constitute 54% of the population and females 46%. Its average literacy rate is 58%, lower than the national average of 59.5%, with male literacy 65% and female literacy 49%. In Narora, 14% of the population is under 6 years of age.

Notable features
Narora is the site of the Narora Atomic Power Station and of the Narora Dam or Narora Barrage.

Education
Places of education include Atomic Energy Central School 1 & 2.

References

External links
UP Ecotourism: Narora, Bulandshahr

Cities and towns in Bulandshahr district